"Lost in the Fifties Tonight (In The Still of the Night)", a single released by country music singer Ronnie Milsap. It is a medley of "Lost in the Fifties Tonight" written by Mike Reid and Troy Seals and a cover of The Five Satins' 1956 hit "In the Still of the Night".

Success
Released in July 1985, the song was Milsap's 42nd single to be released. At the same time, it was also his 27th number-one  hit on the Billboard Hot Country Singles and Tracks chart.

Like many of his other singles, the song also fared well as a crossover hit on the Billboard Adult Contemporary charts as it entered the top 10, peaking at number eight. This is his last top-10 single to appear on this chart.

Critical reception
The song was praised by critics and fans alike, and remains one of Milsap's most popular recordings. In a year when 51 songs rotated out of the Hot Country Singles' number-one  position, "Lost in the Fifties Tonight" was one of just two songs of the group to spend more than one week at number one  (it spent two, as did The Judds' "Have Mercy"), and Milsap's song was the number-one  country song of 1985.

That same year, it won Milsap his fourth Grammy Award for "Best Country Vocal Performance" for a male artist.

Chart history

Weekly charts

Year-end charts

References

External links
 

1985 singles
Billboard Hot Country Songs number-one singles of the year
1985 songs
Ronnie Milsap songs
Songs written by Mike Reid (singer)
Songs written by Troy Seals
Song recordings produced by Tom Collins (record producer)
RCA Records singles
Songs about nostalgia